Draughton may refer to:

Draughton, Northamptonshire, England
Draughton, North Yorkshire, England
Draughton, County Tyrone, a townland in County Tyrone, Northern Ireland